The position of Keeper of the Archives at the University of Oxford in England dates from 1634, when it was established by new statutes for the university brought in by William Laud (Archbishop of Canterbury and Chancellor of the University). The first holder of the post was Brian Twyne, who prepared an index of the archives in 1631 as part of the preparatory work for the statutes: he was appointed Keeper of the Archives as a reward for his work. The archives were moved from the University Church of St Mary the Virgin into the Tower of the Five Orders in the Bodleian Library under Twyne and his successor, and some of the storage cupboards built at that time are still in use. The archives include charters, title deeds, university registers and records, and other official documentation from the university (but not from the colleges of the university, which keep their own archives). Most of the material dates from the 19th and 20th centuries, with few photographs and no sound or video recordings.

In total, 22 people have held the position. Of Philip Bliss, who was Keeper of the Archives for 31 years in the 19th century, it was said that "his penchant for accumulation seems to have impeded administrative efficiency". Reginald Lane Poole, who was in office from 1909 to 1927, took a much narrower view on what should be kept, and criticised his predecessors for their "fatal inability ... to destroy things when they are done with". The third to hold the position, John Wallis (who was also Savilian Professor of Geometry), prepared an index of the collection that was still used into the 20th century. He was succeeded by Simon Bailey, who was the first full-time Keeper of the Archives. Bailey was previously the Archivist under his predecessor, David Vaisey, but a decision was taken to combine the two posts in 2000. The Archives became part of the Bodleian Library in August 2010. The current Keeper is Faye McLeod.

History and role

The position of Keeper of the Archives at the University of Oxford dates from 1634. The university's records pre-date this, and it claims to have one of the longest continuous record-keeping traditions in Britain. Records were initially kept in the Priory of St Frideswide (the site of the present-day Christ Church), moving to the University Church of St Mary the Virgin in the 14th century, where they were housed with money and other valuables. The archives were left in considerable disarray by a burglary in 1544, and remained in chaos until Brian Twyne attended to them in the 17th century. As part of his work as a member of the committee preparing new statutes for the university (at the request of the Chancellor of the University, William Laud), Twyne prepared an index of the archives by 1631, and was appointed the first Keeper of the Archives under the revised statutes in 1634 as a reward for his work. Under Twyne and Gerard Langbaine, his successor as Keeper, the archives were moved into one of the rooms in the Tower of the Five Orders in the Bodleian Library; three of the wooden cupboards that were built at that time to store them are still in use.

The 1634 statutes stated that "the careless keeping of the archives of our University, and the gross ignorance of our privileges" had led to "many mischiefs and losses", particularly in the "almost daily contests with the citizens of Oxford" described by it as "ancient rivals" who "catch at every occasion of impugning our privileges". The statutes provided that "hereafter and for ever, some person shall be sought for", to collect and guard the archives, "that he may produce them without delay whenever occasion requires it". This person was to assist the senior officers of the university and be "an unembarrassed and ready champion in guarding and defending the University privileges and rights." Students at the university (unless exempted by poverty) were to pay 1 shilling towards defence of Oxford's rights, and £40 from this fund was to be paid to the Keeper of the Archives as his salary. Under the 1634 statutes, Convocation (the main governing body of the university at the time) chose the Keeper of the Archives, and there were sometimes contested elections for the position; under the modern statutes, the position is filled by decision of the Committee for the Archives.

The scope of the archives is defined by a university regulation. It includes charters, title deeds, copies of university statutes and regulations, records maintained by the university's Registrar and minutes of meetings, as well as any other official material from the university or its departments that is not in current use and whose preservation is "desirable" in the opinion of the Committee for the Archives. The university archives do not contain material from the colleges of the university, which hold their material separately. The earliest document held, dating from 1214, is a decision of a Papal legate in a dispute between the town of Oxford and the university. The majority of the archives date from the 19th and 20th centuries, and are mainly in paper format, with only a few photographs and no sound or video recordings. 
The archives became part of the Bodleian Library in August 2010, with the Keeper of the Archives reporting to the library's Keeper of Special Collections and Associate Director. Bailey was the first full-time Keeper of the Archives: he was previously the Archivist under his predecessor, David Vaisey, but a decision was taken to combine the two posts in 2000. The Archives became part of the Bodleian's Archives & Modern Manuscripts division in April 2020 and the current Keeper (Faye McLeod, appointed July 2020) now reports to the library’s Head of Archives & Modern Manuscripts. The Keeper works with an Assistant Keeper (a role split between two people each working part-time) and an Archives Assistant.  Some of the holders of the position have been appointed to a Fellowship of one of the colleges; unlike some of the professorships at Oxford, it is not linked to a particular college.

List of Keepers of the Archives
In the table below, "college" indicates the college or hall of the university (if any) at which the individual held an official position, such as a fellowship, during his time as Keeper of the Archives.

Notes

References

External links
Oxford University Archives

1634 establishments in England
 
Lists of people associated with the University of Oxford